John Pew (born April 1, 1956 in Grand Rapids, Michigan) is an American racing driver, who competes in the Grand-Am Rolex Sports Car Series for Michael Shank Racing. He won the 2012 24 Hours of Daytona overall in the No. 60 Michael Shank Racing Ford-Riley Daytona Prototype.

Early racing career
Pew began racing in 2000 in the Skip Barber Racing School. After making his sports car racing debut (see below), he moved to the Star Mazda Masters Championship, winning the title in 2005 for drivers over 45 years old. He returned to the Star Mazda Masters Championship in 2006 but only managed sixth in points, but was the highest-finishing Masters driver in two races.

Grand-Am
Pew made his Rolex Sports Car Series debut in 2004 when he competed in 24 Hours of Daytona in a Baughman Racing Chevrolet Corvette. In 2006, he also competed in the 24 Hours of Daytona with co-drivers Hal Prewitt, Steve Marshall, Danny Marshall, and Ben McCrackin in a Synergy Racing Porsche 911, finishing 17th.

In 2007 Pew moved full-time to sports car racing in Grand-Am's Rolex Sports Car Series Daytona Prototype class with Michael Shank Racing co-driving their car with Ian James. Pew finished 25th in drivers points in the DP class.

In 2008 Pew, James, and Raphael Matos captured his first win at Miller Motorsports Park, and Pew improved to ninth in DP class points. In 2009 he returned to Michael Shank Racing, this time teaming with Michael Valiante and finished 12th in DP driver points.

For 2010 his Michael Shank Racing teammate was Oswaldo Negri and Pew improved to seventh in points. Pew also won the Jim Trueman award for the top Pro-Am racer in the Grand-Am series.  The team of Pew and Negri returned to Shank in 2011 and Pew improved to sixth in DP points, again winning the Jim Trueman award. Pew and Negri returned to Michael Shank Racing in 2012. The team of Pew and Negri along with one-off co-drivers A. J. Allmendinger and Justin Wilson won the 2012 24 Hours of Daytona.

Personal life
Pew is married, to Stephanie. He is an avid recreational sailor who has sailed over 100,000 miles across the world's oceans and currently resides in North Palm Beach, Florida.

Racing record

IMSA WeatherTech SportsCar Championship series results

* Season still in progress

24 Hours of Le Mans results

References

External links
 
 
 

Living people
1956 births
Sportspeople from Grand Rapids, Michigan
Racing drivers from Michigan
24 Hours of Daytona drivers
24 Hours of Le Mans drivers
Rolex Sports Car Series drivers
Indy Pro 2000 Championship drivers
WeatherTech SportsCar Championship drivers
People from North Palm Beach, Florida
Starworks Motorsport drivers
Meyer Shank Racing drivers